The 1996 Molson Indy Toronto was a CART race held on the street course at Exhibition Place in Toronto, Ontario, Canada on July 14, 1996. The race was won by Adrian Fernandez, driving the #32 Lola/Honda for Tasman Motorsports, but was marred by an accident late in the race which resulted in the deaths of rookie driver Jeff Krosnoff and a track worker.

Qualifying
Twenty-eight drivers qualified for the race. The front row consisted of polesitter Andre Ribeiro, driving the #31 Lola/Honda for Tasman Motorsports, and Alex Zanardi, driving the #4 Honda for Chip Ganassi Racing.

Lineup

Media coverage
ABC carried the race in the United States, with Paul Page as the race announcer and former open-wheel series regular Danny Sullivan as the color analyst, with Gary Gerould and Jack Arute as pit reporters. 

In Canada, the race was carried live, flag-to-flag, on CBC with Brian Williams providing play-by-play and Bobby Unser as analyst.  Jon Beekhuis and Ken Daniels served as pit reporters.

In Europe, the race was carried over Eurosport which utilized ABC's feed.

In Brazil, the race was carried live, flag-to-flag, on SBT with Teo José providing play-by-play and Dede Gomez as analyst. Luiz Carlos Azenha served as pit reporter.

Race recap
Although Ribeiro started on pole, Zanardi (who went on to win the series Rookie of the Year award) quickly passed him and led the first lap. He stayed in front until lap 37 when Greg Moore took the point, but regained the lead two laps later and held until lap 65. Bobby Rahal led lap 66 and Adrian Fernandez took the lead on lap 67. Moore got back in front on lap 68 and led for ten laps until Fernandez once again moved to the front on lap 78.

Fatal incident
On lap 91 of the scheduled 95-lap race, the accident that killed Krosnoff took place. With the field having been bunched up due to a restart a few laps prior, Krosnoff, Ribeiro, and Stefan Johansson were all multiple laps down at this point in the race but were still jockeying for position. Entering turn three of the track, the lapped car of Johansson tried to pass Gil de Ferran. Krosnoff was running next to Johansson and Ribeiro was ahead of all three of those cars.

As Johansson made his turn to pass de Ferran, he clipped Krosnoff's car and sent it flying into the catch fencing lining the side of the course. Krosnoff's car's chassis disintegrated on impact with a tree next to catchfence and split into two pieces. The cockpit of the car landed on the opposite side of the track while the rear wheels and engine rolled forward into the runoff area. When the dust finally settled, both Johansson and Ribeiro had come to rest in the runoff area along with the remnants of Krosnoff's car. As the IndyCar safety crew tried to attend to the accident scene, which was littered with debris from Krosnoff's car, Eddie Lawson came barreling toward the scene unaware of what had just taken place. CART officials frantically waved to Lawson to tell him to slow down, which he did just before he reached the scene, and he was able to continue on through the partially blocked track.

Shortly after this, CART officials threw a red flag along with the checkered flag, officially ending the race a few laps before its scheduled finish on lap 92. Krosnoff was removed from the wreck and transported to Toronto's Western Hospital where he was pronounced dead. Dr. Steve Olvey of the CART series and Dr. Hugh Scully of the race medical staff both spoke at the postrace press conference, where Olvey relayed the death was instantaneous and Scully reported that track worker Gary Arvin was also killed in the wreck as a result of being hit by Krosnoff's airborne car.

Aftermath
Krosnoff's death was the second in American open-wheel racing series in 1996, after Indy Racing League driver Scott Brayton was killed in practice for that year's Indianapolis 500. It was also the last death in what eventually became the Champ Car World Series until 1999- coincidentally, that year also featured two deaths as Gonzalo Rodriguez was killed in a practice crash at Laguna Seca and Greg Moore was killed during the Marlboro 500 at California Speedway.

References

Molson Indy Toronto
Molson Indy Toronto
Indy Toronto
1996 in Toronto